Cristina Lopes (born 29 January 1966) is a Brazilian volleyball player. She competed in the women's tournament at the 1992 Summer Olympics.

References

1966 births
Living people
Brazilian women's volleyball players
Olympic volleyball players of Brazil
Volleyball players at the 1992 Summer Olympics
Sportspeople from Brasília